Jack Michael Posobiec III (born December 14, 1984) is an American alt-right political activist, television correspondent and presenter, conspiracy theorist, and provocateur. Posobiec is known for his pro-Donald Trump comments on Twitter, as well as using white supremacist and antisemitic symbols and talking points, including the white genocide conspiracy theory. He has repeatedly planted false and derogatory claims about political figures in an effort to damage his opponents. He has promoted fake news, including the debunked Pizzagate conspiracy theory claiming high-ranking Democratic Party officials were involved in a child sex ring. He was also a promoter of the Stop the Steal movement. From 2018 to 2021, Posobiec was employed by One America News Network (OANN), a far-right cable news television channel, as a political correspondent and on-air presenter. He left OANN in May 2021 to begin hosting a show for the conservative student organization Turning Point USA, and to join conservative news site Human Events as a senior editor.

Early life and education
Posobiec was born and raised in Norristown, Pennsylvania, to a family of Polish descent. His parents were both Democrats. He attended Kennedy-Kenrick Catholic High School and went to college at Temple University. While at Temple, he became the chairman of the Temple University College Republicans and started a chapter of Students for Academic Freedom, an organization run by the David Horowitz Freedom Center. He also participated in a summer internship for U.S. Senator Rick Santorum and volunteered for U.S. Representative Curt Weldon's unsuccessful reelection campaign in 2006. He graduated from Temple in 2006 with a double major in political science and broadcast journalism.

Career

After graduation, Posobiec worked for the United States Chamber of Commerce in Shanghai, China. He played a minor role in the film The Forbidden Kingdom, which was released in 2008. He later worked for WPHT, a conservative talk radio station, and then for the campaign of Steve Johnson in the 2010 Pennsylvania lieutenant gubernatorial election.

Posobiec served several tours in the United States Navy Reserve from 2010 to 2017, reaching the rank of lieutenant junior grade. He was deployed for ten months at Guantanamo Bay Naval Base from September 2012, and worked at the Office of Naval Intelligence (ONI), where he later worked again as a civilian.

During the 2016 election, Posobiec was a special projects director of Citizens for Trump, a pro-Trump organization but not an official group. In March 2017, Posobiec resigned from his full-time civilian position at ONI, saying that his support for Trump led to a "toxic work environment". As of August 2017, his security clearance was suspended and was under review.

Political activities
Posobiec describes himself as a "Republican political operative". During the 2016 election, Posobiec was a special projects director of the political organization Citizens for Trump. Semafor found he was by far the most influential voice with dozens of Republican strategists going into the 2024 campaign season.

He said in 2017 that his work was "reality journalism—part investigative, part activist, part commentary", and that "I'm willing to break the fourth wall. I'm willing to walk into an anti-Trump march and start chanting anti-Clinton stuff—to make something happen, and then cover what happens." Will Sommer, then an editor at The Hill, said in 2017 that Posobiec "make[s] stuff up, relentlessly", and that "there's no one at that level."

On June 16, 2017, Posobiec disrupted a Shakespeare in the Park production of Julius Caesar that depicted the title character as a Trump-like figure. Posobiec was prompted by Mike Cernovich, another alt-right conspiracy theorist, who had offered a $1,000 prize for anyone who interrupted a performance. "You are all Goebbels, you are all Nazis like Joseph Goebbels", he shouted at the audience in a video he posted on Twitter. Posobiec was escorted from the event along with another protester, Laura Loomer, who was arrested for disorderly conduct after refusing to leave the stage.

Posobiec has supported other conservative political figures with similar tactics. He promoted e-mails and files leaked to 4chan of Emmanuel Macron shortly before the French presidential election in 2017. In a video shot for Rebel Media, he promoted the candidacy of Marine Le Pen of the National Front. Posobiec celebrated the Macron leak at a party hosted by Milo Yiannopoulos. In October 2017, Posobiec and Cernovich formed a super PAC called #Rev18 and announced its support for Josh Mandel in the 2018 U.S. Senate election in Ohio. In July 2017, Posobiec handed out flyers thanking Democratic senators for "protecting our quality violent porn content", including "ritual Satanic porn videos". The flyers were distributed outside the U.S. Senate at a demonstration in support of net neutrality.

Posobiec organized a "Rally Against Political Violence" in Washington, D.C., on June 25, 2017, to condemn the shooting of Steve Scalise. Richard Spencer, another alt-right figure who organized a separate, competing rally at the same time, ridiculed Posobiec's event and called it "pathetic". In November 2017, Posobiec encouraged his Twitter followers to target a woman at her workplace after she came forward with allegations that Alabama Senate candidate Roy Moore had attempted to have sex with her when she was 14 years old. In Pennsylvania's 18th congressional district special election in March 2018, Posobiec supported Democrat Conor Lamb over Republican Rick Saccone. Posobiec described Lamb as a "Pro-Trump Dem veteran".

Posobiec's social media and political activities are linked to white supremacist movements. He has published multiple posts containing the white supremacist code "1488", or the Fourteen Words, and supports the use of the slogan. The 88 stands for HH, or Heil Hitler. In October 2016, Posobiec posted a tweet that included triple parentheses, an antisemitic symbol. In response to a 2017 Anti-Defamation League report on the alt-right, which included Posobiec, he tweeted a selfie of his visit to the Auschwitz-Birkenau Memorial in Poland: "The @ADL_National would be wise to remember what happened the last time people made lists of undesirables".

In August 2017, following the 2017 Unite the Right rally in Charlottesville, Virginia, that led to violent clashes between white nationalists and anti-protesters, Posobiec said that the rally had become "massive propaganda" for the left and that the mainstream media was "fanning the flames of this violence." He said that Trump should have disavowed Black Lives Matter. Posobiec later tweeted that he had consistently disavowed white nationalism and violence. He also tweeted that he was "done with trolling" and that it was "time to do the right thing." Posobiec has frequently tweeted about the white supremacist white genocide conspiracy theory.

In June 2020, in Washington, D.C.'s Lincoln Park, Posobiec was shoved and chased for several minutes by a dozen protesters at the Emancipation Memorial. The protesters called Posobiec, who was filming speakers, a Nazi and forced him from the park. Police arrived in a van and, after trying to quell the fracas, helped Posobiec into the van before driving away. Posobiec tweeted later that he was "totally fine" but "filing an assault report with DC police".

On June 9, 2022, the Southern Poverty Law Center listed Posobiec as an extremist, citing his links to hate groups such as the Proud Boys and Oath Keepers, as well as his links to white nationalists, neo-Nazis, anti-government extremists, and the Polish far-right.

Media work
Between September 2016 and March 2017, Posobiec described himself as having previously worked for CBS News in his Twitter profile. CBS News told the Southern Poverty Law Center in 2020 that he had never worked for them.

Between early April and May 2017, Posobiec was employed by Rebel News, a far-right Canada-based website, as its Washington bureau chief, and was granted press access to the White House in April 2017. According to Philadelphia magazine, Posobiec "seem[ed] to have been charged in the press briefing room with haranguing legitimate journalists and running out the clock on press conferences with inane softball questions and Dear Leader obsequiousness" during his short time in the White House press pool.

In May 2017, Posobiec hired neo-Nazi brothers Jeffrey and Edward Clark to help create a documentary about the murder of Seth Rich for Rebel News. Jeffrey Clark was arrested by the FBI on gun charges after saying that the Jewish victims of the October 2018 Pittsburgh synagogue shooting "deserved exactly what happened to them and so much worse". Posobiec later said that he had never heard of Jeffrey Clark and had never made a documentary about Seth Rich, even though HuffPost published photographs of Posobiec and the Clarks working together. He left Rebel News after allegedly plagiarizing a video script from white supremacist Jason Kessler.

From 2018 to 2021, One America News Network (OANN), a far-right cable news television channel, employed Posobiec as a political correspondent and on-air presenter. In September 2018, he presented the pro-Hitler online poster known as Microchip on the network without indicating that person's affiliations, according to the Southern Poverty Law Center. The SPLC said the two men had worked together in spreading disinformation for several years, including the false claims propagated in Pizzagate.

Posobiec left OANN in May 2021 to begin hosting a show for the conservative student organization Turning Point USA, and to join Human Events as a senior editor.

Conspiracy theories, falsehoods, and unsubstantiated claims
Posobiec has promoted many falsehoods, leading to Philadelphia calling him the "King of Fake News" in 2017. He was one of the most prominent promoters on social media of the Pizzagate conspiracy theory, which falsely claimed that high-ranking officials were involved in a child-sex ring centered at a Washington, D.C. pizzeria. He live-streamed an investigation of the pizzeria and was asked to leave after attempting to broadcast a child's birthday party being held in a back room. Posobiec later said he had always thought the Pizzagate theory was "stupid" and had filmed his visit to debunk it.

Posobiec attempted to discredit anti-Trump protesters in November 2016 by planting a sign at a protest reading "Rape Melania". Posobiec denied his involvement to BuzzFeed News, but the same phone number was used in his contact with the website and the text messages he reportedly sent. He said he had been questioned about it by the Secret Service. Posobiec organized the DeploraBall, an event held on January 19, 2017, to celebrate Trump's inauguration.

In December 2016, Posobiec claimed without evidence that Disney had re-written scenes in the Star Wars movie Rogue One to add "Anti Trump scenes calling him a racist", and called for a boycott of the Star Wars franchise. Disney denied the allegations.

Posobiec falsely said that former FBI director James Comey, at a United States Senate hearing on May 17, 2017, "said under oath that Trump did not ask him to halt any investigation". The claim was later repeated by conservative personalities and media outlets, including Fox News, Rush Limbaugh and the InfoWars website. Posobiec promoted the discredited conspiracy theory that Seth Rich had leaked e-mails from the Democratic National Committee to WikiLeaks. Posobiec promoted a hoax that CNN had published and then deleted an article defending Bill Maher's use of a racial slur.

In June 2017, shortly after Republican congressman Steve Scalise was shot and injured during a baseball practice, along with four others, Posobiec tweeted that it was a terrorist attack and blamed comments from liberal anti-Trump individuals. Later, he falsely tweeted that former United States Attorney General Loretta Lynch had called for "blood in the streets" the previous March and that Bernie Sanders had ordered his followers to "take down" Trump.

In December 2017, Posobiec, along with Cernovich, The Gateway Pundit, and InfoWars, promoted a false theory that a passenger train derailment near Dupont, Washington, was linked to the Antifa anti-fascism movement.

In October 2019, after Lt. Col. Alexander Vindman, a White House national security official and decorated Iraq war veteran, testified in Congress about President Trump requesting that the Ukrainian President investigate his political rival Joe Biden, Posobiec falsely claimed that Vindman had been advising the Ukrainian government on ways to prevent Trump from implementing his foreign policy goals.

In June 2020, during the protests against racism and police brutality in the wake of the murder of George Floyd, Posobiec falsely claimed that there were pipe bombs planted at the Korean War Veterans Memorial in Washington D.C. and that "federal assets [were] in pursuit". There were no pipe bombs nor was there any evidence that any "federal assets" investigated. The claim was, however picked up by The Gateway Pundit and retweeted by over 29,000 users on Twitter.

In April 2021, the SPLC reported that between November 2019 and August 2020, Posobiec had tweeted 28 links to SouthFront, a website linked to Russian intelligence. In return, SouthFront promoted Posobiec as well, and cited his tweets in their posts.

Following the 2022 Russian invasion of Ukraine, Posobiec promoted the Ukraine bioweapons conspiracy theory and downplayed the Bucha massacre.

In February 2023, Posobiec tweeted a deep fake video depicting President Joe Biden announcing a military draft in response to a purported national security crisis. Posobiec tweeted false Biden quotes from the fake video, before calling it "a sneak preview of things to come." He later appeared in the video to acknowledge it was a "precreation...of what could happen."

Personal life
From 2012 to 2016, Posobiec ran a blog and podcast about Game of Thrones called AngryGoTFan. Posobiec married in November 2017; he told BuzzFeed News that he met his wife in 2015.

Published works
 The Antifa: Stories from Inside the Black Bloc (Calamo Press, 2021) 
 4D Warfare: A Doctrine for a New Generation of Politics (Castalia House, 2018) 
 Citizens for Trump: The Inside Story of the People's Movement to Take Back America (2017)

References

External links

1985 births
Living people
American conspiracy theorists
American nationalists
American podcasters
Temple University alumni
People from Norristown, Pennsylvania
American people of Polish descent
Alt-right writers
United States Navy officers
United States Navy reservists
YouTube podcasters